Events from the year 1995 in the United Arab Emirates.

Incumbents
President: Zayed bin Sultan Al Nahyan 
Prime Minister: Maktoum bin Rashid Al Maktoum

Establishments

 Wafi City.

Births
March 3 – Zahra Lari, figure skater

References

 
Years of the 20th century in the United Arab Emirates
United Arab Emirates
United Arab Emirates
1990s in the United Arab Emirates